Collège Sainte-Anne is a private Canadian corporation of primary, secondary and pre-university schools located in the western part of Montreal, Canada.

History 
Collège Sainte-Anne was founded in 1861 by the Sisters of Saint Anne, making it one of the oldest schools in Quebec.

Reputation
In 2008, the Fraser Institute ranked its secondary school as one of the best private secondary schools in Quebec. In 2019, the Fraser Institute ranked its secondary school 15th out of all Quebec high schools.

See also 
List of colleges in Quebec
Higher education in Quebec

References

External links 
Official website 
Language stays at Collège Sainte-Anne

High schools in Montreal
Private schools in Quebec
Lachine, Quebec
Educational institutions established in 1861
1861 establishments in Canada